Andre Strode (born June 19, 1972) is a former American football defensive back who played five seasons in the Canadian Football League with the Birmingham Barracudas, BC Lions and Winnipeg Blue Bombers. He played college football at Colorado State University.

College career
Strode played for the Colorado State Rams from 1991 to 1994. He recorded 246 tackles in his college career.

Professional career

Birmingham Barracudas
Strode played for the Birmingham Barracudas in 1995. He was tied for second in the CFL with 7 interceptions, which were returned for 109 yards and one touchdown. He also recorded 73 tackles and 2 fumble recoveries.

BC Lions
Strode played for the BC Lions from 1996 to 1998. He was named a CFL Western All-Star in 1997, starting all 18 games and recording 65 total tackles.

Winnipeg Blue Bombers
Strode played for the Winnipeg Blue Bombers in 1999.

References

External links
Just Sports Stats

Living people
1972 births
Players of American football from Denver
American football defensive backs
Canadian football defensive backs
African-American players of American football
African-American players of Canadian football
Colorado State Rams football players
Birmingham Barracudas players
BC Lions players
Winnipeg Blue Bombers players
Sportspeople from Denver
21st-century African-American sportspeople
20th-century African-American sportspeople